"Goodbye England (Covered in Snow)" is a single by Laura Marling. It was released on December 11, 2009 as the lead single from her second album I Speak Because I Can. The song peaked to number 133 on the UK Singles Chart.

Track listing

Chart performance

Release history

References

2009 singles
Laura Marling songs
2009 songs
Virgin Records singles